"You've Got Something on Your Mind" is a song recorded by American country music artist Mickey Gilley. It was released in August 1985 as the lead single from his album I Feel Good About Lovin' You. The song reached number 10 on the U.S. Billboard Hot Country Singles chart and number 7 on the Canadian RPM Country Tracks chart in Canada. It was written by Norro Wilson, Dave Gibson, and Roger Murrah.

Chart performance

References

1985 singles
Mickey Gilley songs
Songs written by Dave Gibson (American songwriter)
Songs written by Roger Murrah
Songs written by Norro Wilson
Song recordings produced by Norro Wilson
Epic Records singles
1985 songs